Ion Mocanu (born 8 September 1962) is a Romanian former handballer and current coach. He played in France and when he came back in Romania, he continued handball at Dinamo.   He competed in the men's tournament at the 1992 Summer Olympics.

Honours
Club
Dinamo București
Romanian League: 1985–86
Romanian Cup: 1987–88

Montpellier
French League: 1994–95

International
Romania
1990 World Championship – Bronze
1985 World University Games – Gold
1987 World University Games – Gold

References

1962 births
Living people
Romanian male handball players
CS Dinamo București (men's handball) players
Montpellier Handball players
Romanian expatriate sportspeople in France
Olympic handball players of Romania
Handball players at the 1992 Summer Olympics
Expatriate handball players
Romanian handball coaches
Place of birth missing (living people)